Paul C. Huck (born July 22, 1940) is a senior United States district judge of the United States District Court for the Southern District of Florida.

Education and career

Huck was born in 1940 in Covington, Kentucky. He received his Bachelor of Arts degree in 1962 from the University of Florida and his Juris Doctor from the Fredric G. Levin College of Law at the University of Florida in 1965. Huck served in the United States Army Reserve from 1965 to 1972. He was in private practice in Florida from 1965 to 2000 at the law firms Frates, Fay, Floyd & Pearson; Mahoney, Hadlow, & Adams; and Kozyak, Tropin, & Throckmorton.

Huck has taught trial advocacy as an adjunct professor at the University of Miami School of Law while serving on the district court.

Federal judicial service

He was nominated by President Bill Clinton on May 9, 2000, to the United States District Court for the Southern District of Florida, the seat having been vacated by Kenneth Ryskamp. Huck was confirmed by the Senate on June 30, 2000, and received commission on July 11. He assumed senior status on August 31, 2010.

Notable case

Huck has presided over the wire fraud trial of disgraced lobbyist Jack Abramoff in connection with the SunCruz Casinos sale scandal. Huck sentenced Abramoff to five years and 10 months in prison.

Personal life

Huck's daughter-in-law Barbara Lagoa is a United States Circuit Judge on the United States Court of Appeals for the Eleventh Circuit.

References

Sources

1940 births
20th-century American judges
21st-century American judges
Fredric G. Levin College of Law alumni
Judges of the United States District Court for the Southern District of Florida
Living people
Military personnel from Florida
People from Covington, Kentucky
United States district court judges appointed by Bill Clinton
University of Florida alumni